Allen's hummingbird (Selasphorus sasin) is a species of hummingbird that breeds in the western United States. It is one of seven species in the genus Selasphorus.

Description 
Allen's hummingbird is a small bird, with mature adults reaching only  in length. The male has a green back and forehead, with rust-colored (rufous) flanks, rump, and tail. The male's throat is an iridescent orange-red. The female and immature Allen's hummingbirds are similarly colored, but lack the iridescent throat patch, instead having a series of speckles on their throats. Females are mostly green, featuring rufous color only on the tail, which also has white tips. Immature Allen's hummingbirds are so similar to the female rufous hummingbird, the two are almost indistinguishable in the field. The lack of a notch in the second rectrix (R2) is considered an important field mark to distinguish the adult male Allen's hummingbird from rufous hummingbird, particularly the hard to distinguish green-backed variety. Both species' breeding seasons and ranges are common factors used to differentiate between the two species in a particular geographical area.

Taxonomy
Allen's hummingbird was formally described by the French naturalist René Lesson in 1829 and given the binomial name Ornismya sasin. The specific epithet is a Wakashan or Nootka Native American name for a hummingbird. The type locality is San Francisco. Allen's hummingbird is now placed in the genus Selasphorus that was introduced by William Swainson in 1832. The common name commemorates Charles Andrew Allen, an American collector and taxidermist who identified the bird in 1879 in Nicasio, California.

Two subspecies are recognised:
 S. s. sasin (Lesson, R, 1829) – breeds south Oregon and California (USA), winters in south central Mexico
 S. s. sedentarius Grinnell, 1929 – islands off south California (USA)

A hybrid between this species and Anna's hummingbird has been described as Floresi's hummingbird, "Selasphorus" floresii.

Distribution
Allen's hummingbird is common only in the brushy woods, gardens, and meadows of coastal California from Santa Barbara north, and southern coastal Oregon. The nominate race, S. s. sasin, is migratory, and in southern central Mexico. A second, S. s. sedentarius, is a permanent resident on the Channel Islands off southern California. This population colonized the Palos Verdes Peninsula of Los Angeles County in the 1960s and has since spread over much of Los Angeles and Orange Counties, south through San Diego County, and east to the western end of Riverside County.

Behavior

The courtship flight of male Allen's hummingbirds is a frantic back-and-forth flight arc of about  similar to the motion of a swinging pendulum, followed by a high-speed dive from about  during which tail feathers emit a characteristic sharp flutter to further attract attention of the female. Aggressive and territorial, male Allen's hummingbirds will chase any other males from their territory, as well as any other hummingbird species, and have even been known to attack and rout predatory birds several times larger than themselves, such as kestrels and hawks.

Allen's hummingbird constructs its nest out of plant fibers, down, and weed stems, coating the nest with lichens and spider webs to give it structure. The nest is placed above ground on a tree branch or the stalk or stem of a plant. The female lays one or two white eggs, which she incubates for 15 to 17 days. The young leave the nest about three weeks after hatching. The mother continues to feed the fledglings for several more weeks, then the young are left to fend for themselves.

Like all hummingbirds, Allen's hummingbird's high rate of metabolism requires it to feed frequently. It drinks nectar from flowers and eats any small insects in flight or on flower blossoms, providing needed protein.

Gallery

References

External links

 Live Allen's hummingbird nest webcam at Phoebe Allen's Hummingbird Webcam 
 
 Gallery of Allen's Hummingbirds in flight taken with high speed flash
 
 
 
 
 

Allen's hummingbird
Native birds of the West Coast of the United States
Fauna of the San Francisco Bay Area
Allen's hummingbird
Allen's hummingbird